Water puppetry is a tradition that dates back as far as the 11th century when it originated in the villages of the Red River Delta area of northern Vietnam. Today's Vietnamese water puppetry is a unique variation on the ancient Asian puppet tradition.

The puppets are made out of wood and then lacquered. The shows are performed in a waist-deep pool. A large bamboo rod supports the puppet under the water and is used by the puppeteers, who are normally hidden behind a screen, to control them. Thus the puppets appear to be moving over the water.  When the rice fields would flood, the villagers would entertain each other using this form of puppet play.

Performance

Modern water puppetry is performed in a pool of water 4 meters square with the water surface being the stage.  Performance today occurs on one of three venues—on traditional ponds in villages where a staging area has been set up, on portable tanks built for traveling performers, or in a specialized building where a pool stage has been constructed.

Up to 8 puppeteers stand behind a split-bamboo screen, decorated to resemble a temple facade, and control the puppets using long bamboo rods and string mechanism hidden beneath the water surface. The puppets are carved out of wood and often weigh up to 15 kg.

Rice, the main staple of the Vietnamese diet, is usually grown in paddy fields. The original water puppet festivals were literally held inside a rice paddy, with a pagoda built on top to hide the puppeteers who stand in the waist-deep water. The water acts as the stage for the puppets, and as a symbolic link to the rice harvest. It also hides the puppet strings and puppeteer movements, improves the musical and vocal acoustics, and provides a shimmering lighting effect.

A traditional Vietnamese orchestra provides background music accompaniment.  The instrumentation includes vocals, drums, wooden bells, cymbals, horns, đàn bầu (monochord), gongs, and bamboo flutes. The bamboo flute's clear, simple notes may accompany royalty while the drums and cymbals may loudly announce a fire-breathing dragon's entrance.

Singers of chèo (a form of opera originating in north Vietnam) sing songs which tell the story being acted out by the puppets.  The musicians and the puppets interact during performance; the musicians may yell a word of warning to a puppet in danger or a word of encouragement to a puppet in need.

The puppets enter from either side of the stage, or emerge from the murky depths of the water.

Spotlights and colorful flags adorn the stage and create a festive atmosphere.

Content
The theme of the skits is rural and has a strong reference to Vietnamese folklore. It tells of day-to-day living in rural Vietnam and Vietnamese folk tales that are told by grandparents to their grandchildren. Stories of the harvest, of fishing and of festivals are highlighted.

Legends and national history are also told through short skits. Many of the skits, especially those involving the tales of day-to-day living, often have a humorous twist.

Tễu

Chú Tễu ("chú" means uncle, man, boy or Mr. in Vietnamese) is a recurrent and the most notable character in water puppetry. Tễu means "laugh" in ancient Vietnamese. He is a jester who provides witty comments on political and social realities, especially officials' corruption. His appearance is of a smiling boy who often wears nothing but a simple loincloth, sometimes accompanied by a simple open vest.

Gallery

References

Literature

External links

Puppetry
Vietnamese traditional theatre
Vietnamese inventions